Börje Klingberg (born 29 May 1952) is a former international speedway rider from Sweden.

Speedway career 
Klingberg reached the final of the Speedway World Pairs Championship in the 1978 Speedway World Pairs Championship.

He rode in the top tier of British Speedway in 1980, riding for Eastbourne Eagles.

World Final appearances

World Pairs Championship
 1978 -  Chorzów, Silesian Stadium (with Jan Andersson) - 7th - 11pts

Family
His son Niklas Klingberg is also a former Swedish international speedway rider.

References 

1952 births
Living people
Swedish speedway riders
Eastbourne Eagles riders
People from Mariestad Municipality
Sportspeople from Västra Götaland County